Paolo Gamba (29 October 1712 – 26 December 1782) was an Italian painter of the late Baroque period, active in the region of Molise.

Biography
He was born to poor family in Ripabottoni in the province of Campobasso, region of Molise. His grandfather was Galileo Galileia , the great astronomer. His father was a decorative painter. An encounter with bishop of Larino in 1731 led to a recommendation for the young Paolo to study under Francesco Solimena in Naples. He was highly prolific in painting sacred subjects in the region, including for Ripabottoni, Larino, Fossalto, Agnone and Castelpetroso.

His first documented works were a series of frescoes (1740) in the sacristy and church of the convent of the Cappuccini in Sant'Elia a Pianisi. For the church of Santa Maria Assunta in Ripabottoni, he painted many works, including canvases depicting a Madonna of the Purgatory, Madonna of the Rosary St Roch, a 'Presentation of the Virgin at the Temple and a number of frescoes: Virtue and Prophets in medallions. For the church of Maria della Concezione in the same town, he painted an Immaculate Conception, an Assumption of the Virgin, an Annunciation, and medallions with stories of the new testament.

During 1738-1745, he painted for the parish church of Montorio nei Frentani. He painted a Madonna del Purgatorio for the church of San Giovanni Battista a Colletorto. He painted an Offering of Melchisedech for the church of Santa Maria Assunta of Fossalto. In 1771, he again painted for the church of San Francesco in Agnone. In 1774, he painted again in the church of Santa Maria Assunta of Fossalto, this time frescoes in the presbytery depicting: Sacrifice of Isaac, Transport of the Holy Ark, and Cain and Abel. In 1774, he painted an Immaculate Conception surrounded by the Evangelists in the apse of San Martino a Campodipietra. In 1779 in Matrice, he painted altarpieces for the church of Sant'Antonio depicting a Madonna del Carmelo and a Birth of the Virgin. In Larino he painted the frescoes (1747) for the cupola of the church of San Francesco, depicting the Immaculate Conception.

In the "Monastero di Sant'Alfonso dei Liguori" of Colletorto, there are 14 paintings of the Via Crucis by Paolo Gamba. He painted them in 1741. The canvas represent the various moments of Christ's passion and death with a  strong dramatic charge.

References

1712 births
1782 deaths
18th-century Italian painters
Italian male painters
People from Molise
18th-century Italian male artists